Camero may refer to:

Surname
Cándido Camero (born 1921), Cuban percussionist
Juan José Camero (born 1947), Argentine film, television, and theatre actor

Places
Cameros, a comarca in La Rioja, Spain

Common misspellings
Francesco Canero Medici (1886–1946), Italian diplomat
Chevrolet Camaro, a muscle car produced by General Motors (often misspelled as "Camero")